Wakanda is a fictional country appearing in American comic books published by Marvel Comics. Created by Stan Lee and Jack Kirby, the country first appeared in Fantastic Four #52 (July 1966). Wakanda has been depicted as being in East Africa. It is located in sub-Saharan Africa and is home to the superhero Black Panther.  

Wakanda has appeared in comics and various media adaptations, such as in the Marvel Cinematic Universe, where it is depicted as the most technologically advanced nation on the planet.

Location

Some sources place Wakanda just north of Tanzania and exactly at Rwanda, while others such as Marvel Atlas #2  show it at the north end of Lake Turkana, in between South Sudan, Uganda, Kenya  and Ethiopia (and surrounded by fictional countries like Azania, Canaan, and Narobia).  

Director Ryan Coogler stated that his depiction of Wakanda in the 2018 film Black Panther was inspired by the Southern African Kingdom of Lesotho.

In recent stories by writer Ta-Nehisi Coates, Wakanda is located on Lake Victoria, near fellow fictional nations Mohannda, Canaan, Azania, and Niganda. This places these nations mostly in what in real life is the eastern half of the Democratic Republic of the Congo.

Birnin Zana is located within Wakanda. It is considered by some to be a smart city. In Birnin Zana, pedestrians walk along commerce-filled streets that are car-free except for the occasional appearance of (buslike) shuttles. The whole is quite similar to the woonerf concept, an approach to public space design which started in the Netherlands in the 1970s. Maglev trains are seen zipping above and around the city. The Wakandan buildings incorporate some traditional African elements (i.e. thatched roofs and hanging gardens) on some of the tallest structures.

History
Before the emergence of the Wakandan nation, mystic beings known as Originators lived in the region. Originators were diverse races: Anansi (spider-like), Vanyan (ape-like), Creeping Doom (insectoid), Ibeji (two-headed humanoids) and Children of Olokun (sea-creatures).

The Originators were expelled from the region by the humans and the Orisha, the pantheon of Wakanda consisting of Thoth, Ptah, Mujaji, Kokou and Bast, the Panther Goddess.

In the distant past, a massive meteorite made up of the element vibranium crashed in Wakanda. The meteorite was named Mena Ngai. It was unearthed a generation before the events of the present day. T'Challa, the previous Black Panther and brother to the current Black Panther, Shuri, is the son of T'Chaka, the Black Panther before him and a descendant of Olumo Bashenga.  Knowing that others would attempt to manipulate and dominate Wakanda for this rare and valuable resource, T'Chaka conceals his country from the outside world. He sells off minute amounts of the valuable vibranium while surreptitiously sending the country's best scholars to study abroad, consequently turning Wakanda into one of the world's most technologically advanced nations. Eventually, however, the explorer Ulysses Klaue finds his way to Wakanda and covers up his work on a vibranium-powered, sound-based weapon. When exposed, Klaue kills T'Chaka, only to see his "sound blaster" turned on him by a grieving teenaged T'Challa. Klaue's right hand is destroyed, and he and his men flee.

Wakanda has an unusually high rate of mutation due to the dangerously mutagenic properties of the Vibranium Mound. A large number of these Wakandan Mutates are working for Erik Killmonger.

Vibranium radiation has permeated much of Wakanda's flora and fauna, including the Heart-Shaped Herb eaten by members of the Black Panther Tribe (although T'Challa once allowed a dying Spider-Man to eat it in the hope that it would help him deal with a mysterious illness) and the flesh of the White Gorilla eaten by the members of the White Gorilla Tribe.

In the 2008 "Secret Invasion" storyline, Skrull forces led by Commander K'vvvr invade Wakanda and engage Black Panther and his forces. Due to heavy resistance to the deployment of technological developments, both sides are forced to fight with swords and spears. The Wakandan forces voluntarily wear panther masks; this prevents the Skrulls from focusing attacks on their leader. Despite losses, the Wakandans defeat the Skrulls. They kill every single one, including K'vvvr, and send their ship back, packed with the bodies. A warning against invading Wakanda is left written on the wall of the ship's control center.

While under the cosmic power of the Phoenix Force, Namor attacks Wakanda for hiding the Avengers and destroys much of the country with a tidal wave. After the attack, all mutants (particularly those who were siding with Phoenix controlled mutants) are banned from entering Wakanda as stated by Black Panther. Some students from the Jean Grey school are attacked by the Wakandan people; the students barely flee with the help of Storm.

When Hydra manipulates a sentient cosmic cube named Kobik into unknowingly replacing the real Captain America's Steve Roger with his Hydra counterpart, then enact their Secret Empire, Wakanda is under a threat to be taken over by the rise of terrorist group across the universe, with its king T'Challa getting captured and forced to surrender, until all heroes and some villains who rebel against Hydra finally find a way to get both Kobik and the real Steve Rogers back, while rescuing both T'Challa and the rest of both captured and manipulated heroes. Once Hydra's empire has been undone, Wakanda expanded its legacy to form an intergalactic empire on Planet Bast, while also revoking the mutant ban in their country, such as allowing Storm to visit and help anytime. The empire, now encompassing five galaxies, arises after a mission that sought the origin of Mena Ngai, the meteorite that brought the vibranium to Wakanda.

In an alternate timeline set 2000 years in the distant past, a man named after Killmonger's real name, N'Jadaka, became a hero of the empire after retrieving the Shard of M'Kraan during the war against the Shi'ar Empire. However, the current ruler of Wakanda feared that N'Jadaka would overthrow him, so he sent N'Jadaka along with his squad on a secret suicide mission to take the Matrix of the Mamadou galaxy, which was inhabited by the Kronans, Shadow People, and the Klyntar. Upon arriving on a planet in the galaxy, they were quickly attacked by a race known as the Between. Trying to survive, he came across a member of the Klyntar race and bonded with it, since they had a mutual hatred against the current emperor, who made the Klyntar an endangered species. Upon defeating the Between, N'Jadaka and the symbiote killed the emperor and took the throne as the new emperor of the Intergalactic Empire of Wakanda. During this time, he got married and conceived a daughter. Upon finding out that T'Challa from the future had arrived in his present, he feared that T'Challa would join the Maroon rebels, so he had him become a member of the Nameless, slaves who had their memories wiped and were forced to mine for Vibranium on asteroids. However, T'Challa retained his memories of Storm and managed to escape to join the Maroon's regardless. After that, N'Jadaka approached Bast and after recounting his origin, battled Bast's avatar. He was successful in killing it and making his daughter the new Avatar of Bast. After the Maroons got ahold of N'Jadaka's daughter and T'Challa had visited the planet of the Between, N'Jadaka with his army went after the rebels in order to get his daughter back. However, Bast betrayed him and made his Empire fighters crash into the mothership while a rebel commander set the planet holding the rebel base's core to explode as a last ditch attempt to stop him; resulting in the sacrifice of thousands of lives and the apparent death of N'Jadaka.

After N'Jadaka invades Earth, Queen Ramonda forms an alliance with the Originators to prevent total destruction.

Characterization

Name 
There are several theories about the etymology of Wakanda. The name may be inspired by a Siouan god called Wakanda, Wakonda, or Waconda; or Wakandas, a fictional African tribe from Edgar Rice Burroughs' novel The Man-Eater, written in 1915 but published posthumously in 1957; or the Kenyan Kamba ethnic group, also called Akamba or Wakamba; or the word "kanda", which means "family" in Kikongo.

Language 
In the comics, Wakanda has three official languages: Wakandan, Yoruba and Hausa. In the Marvel Cinematic Universe characters from Wakanda are portrayed speaking the South African Xhosa language. The Jabari Tribe are portrayed speaking a dialect similar to Igbo from Nigeria. 

In the 2018 film Black Panther, the Wakandan language is depicted as being written in a Wakandan writing system based on the Nsibidi writing system; the Wakandan writing system was created for the film by production designer Hannah Beachler.

Defenses 
In the comics, Wakanda is the foremost military power on Marvel Earth. The Wakandan Army is the country's main ground forces, while the Wakandan Navy oversees naval operations. The Wakandan Air Guard is the nation's air force, which includes pilots wearing powerful suits of combat armor. In order to ensure peace and stability in Wakanda, the Black Panther picked Dora Milaje ("adored ones") from rival tribes to serve as his personal guard and ceremonial wives-in-training. Wakanda has its own intelligence system known as the N'Charu Silema; a spy network that worked across the globe to maintain the nation's secrecy. It was considered as good as the Mossad and certainly better than the CIA and MI6. later, P.R.I.D.E. (Princess Regent Intelligence Division Executives) was developed as the nation's protection agency. Wakanda is one of the few Earth-616 civilizations who have contingency plans for dealing with Galactus, "The Devourer of Worlds".

Wakandan religion 
Wakanda contains a number of religious sects originating from various places in Africa, the Pantheon of Wakanda is known as The Orisha. Orisha is a Yoruba word meaning spirit or deity. Bast the Panther Goddess, Thoth, god of the moon and wisdom, and Ptah, the Shaper, are Heliopolitan deities, who left ancient Egypt at the time of the pharaohs.  Kokou is a warrior orisha from Benin. Mujaji is a rain goddess of the Lobedu people of South Africa. Other deities are worshiped in Wakanda, such as Sekhmet and Sobek, other Helipolitan deities, and the gorilla gods Ghekre and Ngi, worshiped by the Jabari tribe. The mutant Ororo Munroe (aka Storm), ex-wife of T'Challa and former queen of Wakanda, is called Hadari-Yao ("Walker of Clouds" in ancient Alkamite), a goddess who preserves the balance of natural things. Other little-known gods of Wakanda are enemies of Bast,:K'Liluna, the Bast's sister, considered a betrayer, and Magba.

Panther cult
Bast the Panther Goddess, based on Bast the ancient Egyptian deity, is the primary deity of Wakanda. After the vibranium meteor fell, a number of Wakandans were painfully mutated into "demon spirits" and began attacking their fellow Wakandans.

T'Challa's ancestor Olumo Bashenga began to close the vibranium mound to outsiders. He formed a religious order that guarded the mound and fought to keep the "demon spirits" from spreading across the kingdom. As the ceremonial and religious role, he took the title of Black Panther as chief of the Panther Tribe. As part of the cult's ceremonies, a Black Panther is entitled to the use of a heart-shaped herb. The herb enhances the physical attributes of the person who consumes it to near-superhuman levels, in a similar manner to the super-soldier serum.

White Gorilla cult
The tribe that would become the Jabari worshiped Ngi, who was responsible for creating Gorilla-Man. Ngi was based on the Yaounde deity of the same name. Currently, the Jabari tribe worship the gorilla god Ghekre, based on the Baoulé deity of the same name. Wakanda evolved from a hunter-warrior society, and was traditionally ruled by its greatest warrior. The dominant Black Panther Cult outlawed the rival White Gorilla Cult's worship in Wakanda. M'Baku (Man-Ape) of the Jabari tribe is one of Wakanda's greatest warriors, second only to T'Challa, the Black Panther himself. While T'Challa, king of Wakanda, is on a several month leave of absence from Wakanda, the ambitious M'Baku plots to usurp the throne. M'Baku flouts T'Challa's edicts and revives the White Gorilla Cult, killing one of the rare white gorillas living in the jungles near Wakanda. M'Baku bathes in the gorilla's blood and eats its flesh which "mystically" confers the gorilla's great strength upon M'Baku. He tries to defeat T'Challa in combat, hoping to take over the country, but is beaten and banished from Wakanda.  According to the 2018 film, the White Gorilla cult, known in the film as the Jabari (or the Mountain Tribe), revere the monkey god Hanuman.

Lion cult
Sekhmet the Lion Goddess, based on the deity of the same name, could possess the form of any human worshipers or the bodies of those sanctified and sacrificed by her worshipers, she transformed these subjects into human avatars of herself. She has a number of other powers, some of which she has demonstrated. Sekhmet could grow in size, move at rapid speeds, teleport herself and others, and alter her specific density. The Lion goddess possessed superhuman strength and durability, and she was immortal. She can manipulate the minds of the weak-willed.

Little is known of the history of the Lion Goddess. She had apparently lost many worshipers over the years to the Cult of the Panther God, despite the fact that Sekhmet physically manifested before its followers, and the Panther God only appears to its priests.

Crocodile cult
Sobek the Crocodile God, based on the deity of the same name, appears to be an ancient and somewhat neglected Wakandan deity.

Cultural impact and legacy

Accolades 
 In 2019, CBR.com ranked Wakanda 5th in their "10 Most Iconic Superhero Hideouts In Marvel Comics" list.
 In 2020, CBR.com ranked Wakanda 1st in their "10 Most Powerful Fictional Nations In the Marvel Universe" list.
 In 2021, Screen Rant included Wakanda in their "10 Most Important Fictional Marvel Comics Countries" list.
 In 2022, CBR.com ranked Wakanda 5th in their "The Avengers' 10 Best Allies In Marvel Comics" list.

Cultural impact 

 In December 2019, it was discovered that the US Department of Agriculture's website listed Wakanda as a free-trade partner, with a list of traded goods which included ducks, donkeys and dairy cows. The USDA claimed the fictional country had been added to the list "by accident during a staff test" and removed it soon after the public became aware of it.

 The Wakandan capital city, Birnin Zana, could offer an alternative for what future cities could be like in Africa. There are already many smart city initiatives being worked out in Africa, with many ecocities emerging across the continent.

 Senegalese-American singer Akon announced plans to build "Akon City", a solar-powered "real-life" Wakanda on 2,000 acres of coastal land in Senegal inspired by Birnin Zana. He first shared his concept for a futuristic, technologically advanced city in 2018 and said it would welcome members of the African diaspora. The Washington Post reported that the project had secured $4 billion of the $6 billion investment necessary to build Akon City.

 Technology writers have also compared Wakandan principles to those expressed in African technology research. Anti-colonial AI, for example, has been described as "in keeping with Wakandan principles" by developing technology for benevolent purposes. It also seeks "to avoid algorithmic exploitation and algorithmic oppression" in artificial intelligence.

 The Wakanda name has also been adopted in small businesses. One example is Wakanda Place, an African and multicultural bar in Adelaide, South Australia. Entertainment at the bar includes DJs who play music from Africa and the African diaspora.

In other media

Television
 Wakanda appears in the 1996 Fantastic Four episode "Prey of the Black Panther".
 Wakanda appears in the Black Panther TV series.
 Wakanda appears in The Avengers: Earth's Mightiest Heroes.
 Wakanda appears in the Marvel Disk Wars: The Avengers episode "His Majesty, Black Panther!"
 Wakanda appears in Avengers Assemble. In the episode "The Panther and the Wolf", it is revealed that some of the Wakandans are part of the Shadow Council while others are either high-ranking or less fortunate.

Film
 Wakanda appears in the straight-to-DVD animated feature Ultimate Avengers 2. This version is an extreme isolationist nation that views all outsiders as enemies.
 Wakanda appears in Lego Marvel Super Heroes - Black Panther: Trouble in Wakanda.
 Wakanda appears in the Disney XD short film Black Panther in ... The Visitor.

Marvel Cinematic Universe

Wakanda appears in media set in the Marvel Cinematic Universe (MCU). Inhabitants from this version of the country speak in the Xhosa language, as T'Challa's actor Chadwick Boseman developed using a "regional accent based on where Wakanda would be. He did great research on the very cultural aspects of the character. Even though it's a fictional culture, [he figured] out ways to tether it into real African culture." Additionally, it is located at the northern end of Lake Turkana, at a fictional point bordering Ethiopia, South Sudan, Uganda, and Kenya. In real life, this area is actually a disputed border region known as the Ilemi Triangle, claimed by each of these countries. This follows the location of the country in the comics according to Marvel Atlas #2.

The film Black Panther further established that, in keeping with this map location, it is a landlocked country in the central mountains far from the coasts. Impassable mountains and jungles around its borders have helped Wakanda isolate itself from outsiders. Internally, Wakanda consists of lush river valleys, mountain ranges rich in natural resources, and a fabulous capital city that integrates space-age technology with traditional designs.

Wakanda consists of five tribes, four of which are united under the rule of the first Black Panther 10,000 years ago. As in the comics, the four tribes (The River tribe, the Mining tribe, the Merchant tribe, and the Border tribe) worship Bast, the panther god, amongst others, and also have a strong spiritual tradition of ancestor worship.

 The River Tribe wear green clothes made from crocodile skin, with some males wearing a lip plate.
 The Mining Tribe are in charge of the Vibranium that is mined, stored, and utilized.
 The Merchant Tribe are responsible for trades and crafts of art, clothing and pieces of art. They also wear veils during a trade to maintain anonymity.
 The Border Tribe reside on the mountainous borders of Wakanda posing as farmers in order to deceive foreigners of Wakanda's wealth as well as their talent for breeding white rhinoceros for many purposes.
 The fifth tribe are the Jabari (or Mountain Tribe) who follow the White Gorilla cult of the god Hanuman and are staunch traditionalists who isolate themselves in the mountains. While considered part of Wakanda, the Black Panther's hold over the Jabari is tenuous. During the film, their leader M'Baku rejects T'Challa as a worthy heir to the throne during his coronation and challenges him to ceremonial combat to claim it for himself. T'Challa wins the duel but lets M'Baku leave in peace.

The lords of each tribe sit on the king's council, and after the Mountain tribe assists T'Challa in his overthrow of the usurper, Erik "Killmonger" Stevens, M'Baku is also granted a seat on the council in recognition of his loyalty. The four main tribes speak a version of the Xhosa language while the Jabari speak an Igbo dialect. The opening animated sequence to Black Panther explains Wakanda was aware that the outside world was becoming increasingly chaotic throughout various historical events that affected Africa, such as the Atlantic slave trade, the colonization of Africa by European powers, World War I, and World War II. The Black Panthers of the past, however, were devoted to defending their own country and did not interfere, instead choosing to hide Wakanda from the world - fearing that if they became involved and revealed themselves, it would eventually lead to outsiders trying to invade Wakanda. Instead, Wakanda passes itself off as a small, poor Third World nation of humble herdsmen, using an advanced holographic projection shroud around its borders to hide the advanced technological civilization within. A core tension of the film's narrative is that the new Black Panther, T'Challa, is torn between his loyalty to hide and defend Wakanda as its king, and his own conscience to help the faltering world beyond its borders. Later in the film, Killmonger arrives to try to seize the throne - sharing T'Challa's desire to end Wakanda's isolationism, but by conquering the outside world using Wakanda's advanced technologies and weapons instead. Ultimately, T'Challa defeats Killmonger and decides to reveal Wakanda's true nature to the world during an address at the United Nations. The film's popularity led to a trend among athletes and celebrities around the world to throw up "Wakanda Forever" salutes after their victories. Director Ryan Coogler stated that his depiction of Wakanda was inspired by the southern African kingdom of Lesotho. Basotho blankets also became more known as a result of the film and its basis on Lesotho.

Below are Wakanda's featured appearances:

 Wakanda is briefly shown on a holographic map in Iron Man 2, and is mentioned in Avengers: Age of Ultron as the source nation of vibranium, but appears for the first time in the final scene of Captain America: Civil War, where Steve Rogers takes refuge with Bucky Barnes and to ask for the Wakandans' help in undoing Barnes's Hydra brainwashing. The film also introduces Black Panther to the MCU, ahead of his solo film.

 Wakanda's background and culture is further expanded in the aforementioned solo film, which establishes that, as in the comics, the Black Panther's superhuman abilities come from consuming the "heart-shaped herb", local vegetation that was mutated over millions of years following exposure to Vibranium. 

 In Avengers: Infinity War, members of the Avengers travel to Wakanda in the hopes that the country's advanced science can remove the Mind Stone from Vision without killing him. When the Outriders attack Wakanda, the Avengers join forces with the Wakandan army to fight them. Despite the aid of Thor, Rocket, and Groot, Thanos arrives in Wakanda and claims the Mind Stone, completing the Infinity Gauntlet. He then eliminates half the population of the universe, including T'Challa and several Wakandans, in an event later referred to as the Blip.

 In Avengers: Endgame, Wakandan troops restored from the Blip rally behind T'Challa in Wakanda before passing through portals to a battlefield in upstate New York to fight the forces of Thanos. Following the victory in that battle, Wakanda holds a celebration for the Blip's victims' restoration.

 In The Falcon and the Winter Soldier (2021), Barnes has a flashback showing his recuperation following his brainwashing being undone.

 In What If...?, Wakanda is depicted in different timelines; at the second episode, T'Challa reunites with his family in Wakanda after having been mistakenly abducted by Yondu Udonta and the Ravagers 20 years earlier. During the final moments of the fifth episode, Wakanda is shown, besieged by zombies and led by a zombified Thanos wielding a nearly-complete Infinity Gauntlet. In the sixth episode, Killmonger instigates conflict between Wakanda and the United States and becomes the new Black Panther. In the ninth episode, Shuri leads Pepper Potts and the Dora Milaje to arrest Killmonger, but find he disappeared due to him having been recruited by the Watcher to help fight an alternate Ultron.
 On February 1, 2021, a Disney+ series set in Wakanda was announced to be in development, with Coogler being involved through his company, Proximity Media. 

 In Black Panther: Wakanda Forever, Wakanda is featured and its capital city is attacked by Namor and his army.

Video games
 Wakanda appears as a stage in Marvel: Ultimate Alliance 2.
 Wakanda makes a cameo in Storm's ending in Marvel vs. Capcom 3: Fate of Two Worlds.
 Wakanda's Vibranium mines appear as a level stage in Marvel Heroes.
 Wakanda appears as a stage in Disney Infinity 3.0.
 Wakanda, merged with Monster Hunter 4s Val Habar to become Valkanda, appears as a stage in Marvel vs. Capcom: Infinite.
 Wakanda appears in Lego Marvel Super Heroes 2. Kang the Conqueror steals it, among other locations to create Chronopolis.
 A Wakandan embassy appears Marvel's Spider-Man series, developed by Insomniac Games. A Wakandan Flag is also a collectible Time Capsule item in the series' Miles Morales followup.
 Wakanda appears in Marvel Ultimate Alliance 3: The Black Order.
 Wakanda appears in the digital collectible card game Marvel Snap.
 Wakanda appears in the "Black Panther: War for Wakanda" DLC for Marvel's Avengers. Five years prior, T'Challa was going to align Wakanda with the Avengers. However, following Captain America's assumed death and the Avengers' disbandment, he closed Wakanda's borders. In the present, after Captain America was found alive and Avengers is reassembled, A.I.M. hires Klaw to assist in their efforts to steal Vibranium and scientists from Wakanda, but T'Challa and Wakanda's forces work with the Avengers to repel the villains. After Klaw's demise, T'Challa relieves from his duty as a king and appointed his sister, Shuri as the country's new queen.

Books

Novels
 J. Holland, Jesse. Black Panther: Who is the Black Panther? (2017)  
 Jim McCann. Black Panther - The Junior Novel (2018) - novelization of the movie Black Panther. 
 Ronald L. Smith. Black Panther: The Young Prince 
 Nic Stone. Shuri: A Black Panther Novel (2020) 
Nic Stone. Shuri:The Vanished (2021)

Anthology
 J. Holland, Jesse. Black Panther: Tales of Wakanda (2021) .

Little Golden Books
Two Little Golden Books were published.
 Frank Berrios. Black Panther (2018) 	
 Frank Berrios. Warriors of Wakanda (2018)

Mighty Marvel Chapter Books
 Brandon T. Snider Black Panther: Battle for Wakanda (2018)

See also
List of fictional African countries
Wakamba, a Bantu ethnic group in Kenya.
Wauconda, places in the United States with a similar sounding name
Black Panther: Wakanda Forever, 2022 American superhero film based on the Marvel Comics character Black Panther

References
  Text in this article was copied from Wakanda at the Marvel Database, which is released under a Creative Commons Attribution-Share Alike 3.0 (Unported) (CC-BY-SA 3.0) license.

External links
 Wakanda at the Marvel Universe wiki
 The Origin of Black Panther and Wakanda
 A Guide to the Myths, Legends, and Gods of Wakanda
 World of Black Heroes: Wakanda Biography
 
 The Religion of Black Panther
 
 Marvel Directory: Man-Ape
 Marvel Universe Online: Queen Divine Justice
 Black Panther series index
 

1966 in comics
Fictional elements introduced in 1966
Afrofuturism
Africanfuturism
Fictional African countries
Marvel Comics countries
Marvel Comics locations

Fictional kingdoms
Bastet
Ptah
Sekhmet